Jet Ski Fishing is the practice of rigging a personal watercraft with fishing rods and accessories in order to travel to an area for fishing.

Jet ski fishing is one of the fastest growing categories in the personal watercraft and fishing industries. There are four types of fishing rigs for jet ski fishing:

JETWINGS Fishing pontoons: Pontoons are manufactured from fibre glass and attached to any jet ski or PWCs to maintain its stability in the water, with built-in buoyancy to prevent it from sinking. There is ample storage space to organize your jetski. Jetwings has live well, luna tubes, bait boards, trolling rod holders, storage rod holders.
 PWC Bracket System: The safest and easiest method, this consists for a bracket coming out of the ski hook at the back of the Jet Ski typically just under the seat and above the transom. Another bracket is installed on the steering column. This method is clean, as in there is no damage to the machine, it is easy and fast to install and is the most economical of the three systems.
Rear Basket system: This method has been around for a while and allows the user to attach a tray to the back of their PWC on the landing ramp. The basket is held on by bungee clamps, straps and clips. This basket allows the attachment of steel tubes for rods and the basket allows a cooler to be installed onto the back of the machine. The basket and cooler can be an obstacle when re-boarding the jet ski.
Chrome Tube: This method is the most elaborate of the three methods, and involves drilling holes into the PWC to attach large chrome tubing over the midsection and aft areas of the PWC. It is also the most time consuming and damaging of the three methods. The costs are also to be considered, installing the mid and aft structures can cost several thousands and also obstructs the passenger egress from the water back onto the machine.

This sport is said to have originated in South Africa and has become popular in Australia and New Zealand, and in 2015 the sport has started to get traction in North America. A personal watercraft can support two fishermen on the water. There are several methods of fishing from a PWC: trolling, casting and drift jigging, all of which are productive and are used regularly.  When trolling there are two positions where the rods can be installed, off the aft and off the steering column.

There are several obstacles to overcome when taking a stock PWC and converting it to a fishing platform. Firstly the fisherman needs to have a place to store and mount fishing gear such as rods and reels, nets and gaffs. All three methods above address that problem. Storage space is required, and the most popular method is to use saddle bags or a catch bag and a console bag, giving extra storage area for touring and fishing. In addition there are three compartments on a Jet Ski, the front compartment, the console hatch and there is generally a bucket under the rear seat. The final hurdle is where to store the catch, either in a catch bag (the easiest and most economical method) or a more costly cooler and basket.

Personal watercraft are regularly used for touring, they are used by groups of people to travel from port to port. Many of these machines are being used for overnight camping in combination with fishing.

The majority of jet ski fishing is done off three or four seat PWCs, the larger area allowing for the movement required to handle a fish whether there are one or two fishermen on board.

References 

Fishing equipment